Stanley James E. Allan (28 December 1886 – 4 May 1919) was an English professional footballer who played in the Football League for Newcastle United, West Bromwich Albion and Nottingham Forest as a forward.

Personal life 
Allan attended College of St Hild and St Bede, Durham between 1906 and 1908 and during that time, he worked as a physical education teacher at a school in Wallsend. He later taught physical education at the Higher Grade School in Stockton-on-Tees. Allan married in 1915 and had two children. He served as a private in the Royal Army Medical Corps during the First World War and served on the Western Front from May 1918 through the April 1919, after the war. While home on demobilisation leave in May 1919, Allan died of a combination of Spanish flu and pneumonia and he was buried in Church Bank Cemetery, Wallsend.

Career statistics

Honours 
Newcastle United

 FA Charity Shield: 1909

References

English footballers
Newcastle United F.C. players
Sunderland A.F.C. players
West Bromwich Albion F.C. players
Nottingham Forest F.C. players
English Football League players
1886 births
1919 deaths
Worcester City F.C. players
Association football forwards
Association football inside forwards
British Army personnel of World War I
Royal Army Medical Corps soldiers
Sportspeople from Wallsend
Footballers from Tyne and Wear
British military personnel killed in World War I
Deaths from the Spanish flu pandemic in England
Military personnel from Newcastle upon Tyne

British schoolteachers
Alumni of the College of St Hild and St Bede, Durham